Donji Lukavac is a village in the municipality of Gradačac, Bosnia and Herzegovina.

Demographics 
According to the 2013 census, its population was 836.

References

Populated places in Gradačac